Stage Door Witchdoctors was, until 2008, Chants R&B's only full length album. Released in 2000, it is a compilation of live performances and studio singles. Most of the tracks were later included on Chants R&B, a vinyl album on Norton (2008), along with some tracks not included on Stage Door Witchdoctors.

Track listing
 "Neighbour Neighbour" Meaux - 2:34
 "I'm Your Witchdoctor" Mayall - 2:05
 "Mystic Eyes" Morrison - 2:54
 "Come See Me" Jackson, Tubbs - 2:31
 "Early in the Morning" Traditional - 1:53
 "I Want Her" Butler, Courtney - 2:40
 "I've Been Loving You Too Long" Butler, Redding - 2:51
 "I Forgot How It's Been" Courtney, Hansen, Rudd, Tomlin - 2:24
 "One Two Brown Eyes" Morrison - 2:48
 "When I Find Out" Mayall - 2:38
 "That's the Way It's Got to Be" - 2:14
 "Don't Bring Me Down" May, Taylor - 2:03
 "Land of a Thousand Dances" Garcia - 2:29
 "Interview With Jim Tomlin" - 9:49

References 

2000 albums
Chants R&B albums